The Ven.  George Maddison  (1809- 1895)  was  Archdeacon of Ludlow from 1877 to 1891.

Maddison was educated at Jesus College, Cambridge. He was ordained deacon in 1832; and priest in 1833. Maddison held incumbencies in Cambridge, Grantham and Richard's Castle. He was also Chaplain to Henry Philpott, the Bishop of Worcester from 1861 to 1890.

Notes

Alumni of Jesus College, Cambridge
Archdeacons of Ludlow
1809 births
1895 deaths